The 1996–97 Torquay United F.C. season was Torquay United's 63rd season in the Football League and their fifth consecutive season in Division Three. The season runs from 1 July 1996 to 30 June 1997.

Season summary

Results

Third Division

FA Cup

League Cup

Football League Trophy

Player statistics
(not including Football League Trophy or FA Cup)

References

Torquay United
Torquay United F.C. seasons